David E. Warford (1866−1942) was an Arizona cowboy. He served as a member of the Rough Riders in Cuba as part of B Company, 1st Volunteer Cavalry Regiment. In June 1898 during the Battle of Las Guasimas, a bullet entered his right thigh, ricocheted through his abdomen and exited out his left thigh. He was evacuated to a hospital ship. In 1901, he was appointed as a United States Forest Ranger. In 1903, he enlisted as a private in the Arizona Rangers. Warford was known for tattoos covering from his neck to ankles. In 1915 he lived at the Pacific Branch of the National Home for Disabled Volunteer Soldiers. He was buried at the Sawtelle Soldiers' Cemetery in Los Angeles, California.

References

1866 births
1942 deaths
Arizona Rangers
Cowboys
Military personnel from Troy, New York
People known for being heavily tattooed
Rough Riders
United States Forest Service officials